Carsten Nielsen (born 12 August 1955) is a Danish former football player.

Honours
Neuchâtel Xamax
Swiss Super League: 1987–88
Swiss Super Cup: 1987

References

External links
 Danish national team profile 
 

1955 births
Living people
Danish men's footballers
Denmark international footballers
Denmark under-21 international footballers
Bundesliga players
Borussia Mönchengladbach players
Ligue 1 players
RC Strasbourg Alsace players
Neuchâtel Xamax FCS players
Kjøbenhavns Boldklub players
Danish expatriate men's footballers
Expatriate footballers in France
Expatriate footballers in Switzerland
Expatriate footballers in West Germany
Association football midfielders
Footballers from Copenhagen
CS Chênois players
UEFA Cup winning players
Danish expatriate sportspeople in France
Danish expatriate sportspeople in Switzerland
Danish expatriate sportspeople in West Germany